Albert of Genoa, also known as Lambert of Genoa, was a Cistercian hermit. Born in Genoa, Italy, Albert entered the Cistercian abbey nearby. There he remained for the rest of his life as a lay brother and a hermit.

References

1239 deaths
13th-century Christian saints
13th-century Genoese people
13th-century Roman Catholics
Italian Roman Catholic saints
Italian Cistercians
Italian hermits
Year of birth unknown